The 2021 Pakistan Super League (also known as PSL 6 or for sponsorship reasons HBL PSL 2021) was the sixth season of the Pakistan Super League, a franchise Twenty20 cricket league established by the Pakistan Cricket Board (PCB) in 2015. It was initially scheduled to be the second season held entirely in Pakistan in February and March 2021, after the previous seasons were held elsewhere due to the security situation there.

On 4 March 2021, the PCB suspended the tournament with 14 of the scheduled 30 group matches having been played after multiple cases of COVID-19 were recorded. In March, the PCB proposed to reschedule the remaining fixtures for June 2021 with all matches to be held in Karachi, however, on 4 May, all the teams asked the PCB to move to the United Arab Emirates (UAE) because of a surge in COVID-19 cases in Pakistan.

On 20 May 2021, approval was granted to play the remaining matches of the PSL 6 in Abu Dhabi and the tournament restarted on 9 June. On 24 June 2021, Multan Sultans beat Peshawar Zalmi in the final, by 47 runs to win their first title.

Background
The PSL was set up in 2015 and began in 2016 — meaning this was the sixth edition of the tournament. This was the third year of Habib Bank Limited's (HBL) sponsorship deal with the tournament. This was supposed to be the second season held entirely in Pakistan, owing to the security situation there in previous seasons which caused it to be held in the UAE. After the previous edition was postponed because of COVID-19 pandemic, the tournament was expected to be held behind closed doors. However, the Pakistani government gave approval to host the tournament at 20% capacity. An extra 10% could also have been allowed in after the group stage, but was not when the tournament moved to the UAE. Speaking about crowds, PCB chairman Ehsan Mani said that he hoped if they could maintain tight protocols during the tournament, they could increase capacity later in the year for future tours of Pakistan. It was rumored that starting from this edition, the PSL would have a dedicated window in the ICC Future Tours Programme.

Squads

On 9 January 2021, the PCB announced the retained players' list. The players draft took place on 10 January in Lahore. On 15 February, Mohammad Rizwan replaced Shan Masood as the captain of the Multan Sultans.

Later, a replacement draft was held, in which additional players were picked up to replace players unavailable due to COVID-19 pandemic, which also forced the rescheduling of the tournament. On 27 April, Colin Munro rejoined Islamabad United for the remaining matches. The final squads were confirmed by 22 May, when the Lahore Qalandars re-signed Rashid Khan after his replacement Shakib Al Hasan pulled out of the PSL.

Venues
In June 2020, the PCB announced they planned to add Arbab Niaz Stadium, Peshawar, as a fifth venue in this edition of the PSL. However, delays in the stadium's construction made it difficult to host the tournament's matches. The PCB planned to hold a few matches in Faisalabad and Hyderabad, as well. In addition, the Hayatabad Stadium was announced as a possible venue for some matches. In September 2020, the PCB confirmed that both the Arbab Niaz Stadium in Peshawar and Bugti Stadium in Quetta, could not host this season's matches. However, it was later decided that the tournament would be held only at Karachi and Lahore. After the tournament was moved to the UAE, the remaining matches took place at the Sheikh Zayed Cricket Stadium.

The stadiums were initially allowed to hold only 20% capacity per match; 7,500 in Karachi and 5,500 in Lahore; in view of COVID-19 pandemic in Pakistan. Tickets were available only online via Pakistan's online ticketing platform Bookme.pk, from 11 February.

Match officials

Umpires

  Faisal Afridi
  Aleem Dar
  Michael Gough
  Zameer Haider
  Richard Illingworth
  Imran Javed
  Ahsan Raza
  Shozab Raza
  Rashid Riaz
  Asif Yaqoob

Referees
  Iftikhar Ahmed
  Mohammed Anees
  Muhammad Javed
  Roshan Mahanama
  Ali Naqvi

Promotion in  the media

Anthems

The league was promoted on social media with the hashtags #MatchDikhao, #HBLPSL6 and the hashtag of the official anthem #GrooveMera by Naseebo Lal, Aima Baig and Young Stunners.

For the first time, five more tracks were released on the cricket album called HBL PSL Taranay.

Opening ceremony

The ceremony was telecast as a virtual opening programme after being recorded in Istanbul, Turkey, instead of having a live ceremony at the stadium because of the pandemic. The artists' line up included Atif Aslam and the performers of the official anthem.

COVID-19 pandemic impact

The day before the tournament was due to start, Wahab Riaz and Daren Sammy, both of Peshawar Zalmi, were put in isolation after they met with team owner Javed Afridi, who was not part of the bubble. However, after they both received results of a negative COVID test, they were allowed to rejoin the side.

On 1 March, Fawad Ahmed of Islamabad United was reported to have tested positive for COVID-19, which led to the postponement of their match against Quetta Gladiators by one day. On 4 March, it was reported that three more players had tested positive, including Tom Banton and a support staff member. Later that day, it was announced that the tournament had been suspended after seven new cases were reported. Dr Sohail Saleem, Head of the Medical Panel, submitted his resignation to chairman Ehsan Mani following increasing criticism over the abrupt postponement of the tournament.

After the postponement, the PCB formed a two-member fact-finding committee to investigate the causes behind the bio-secure bubble breaches.

The PCB announced on 11 March that they were looking to reschedule the remaining fixtures for June 2021. A week later, they proposed the tournament would either start on  either 2 or 6 June, finishing on 20 June with all matches to take place in Karachi.

On 11 April, the PCB announced the tournament's revised schedule with the competition due to restart on 1 June. On 4 May 2021, all the teams asked the PCB to move the remaining matches to the UAE because of an increase of COVID-19 in Pakistan.

The Emirates Cricket Board (ECB) gave green light to the Pakistan Cricket Board for holding the remaining matches of the PSL 2021 in Abu Dhabi on 18 May. However, it was also reported that the Abu Dhabi government put forward a condition that all the participants needed to be vaccinated against COVID-19. Following this, the PCB and the team owners held a virtual meeting on 19 May to review all potential scenarios and unanimously agreed to wait until the close of business on 20 May (UAE time) regarding clarifications on certain requested exemptions before a final decision on the hosting of the remaining matches was made. In May 2021, the Pakistan Super League finally secured all exemptions and approvals required to conduct the remainder of the 2021 season in Abu Dhabi.

Another bubble breach took place after the resumption of the tournament, this time the day before the final. Haider Ali and Umaid Asif, both of Peshawar Zalmi, admitted that they had met people from outside their bubble and were suspended from competing in the final.

League stage

Format

Points table

Summary

League progression

Fixtures
The PCB confirmed the fixtures for the tournament on 8 January 2021. The tournament was initially scheduled to take place in February and March.

Pakistan

United Arab Emirates

Summary

Week 1
In the opening game of PSL 2021, the Karachi Kings beat the Quetta Gladiators by 7 wickets. For Karachi, Joe Clarke scored 46 off 23 to help register their first win of the season. While in game two, Rashid Khan made his debut for the Lahore Qalandars, helping them to a 4 wicket win over Peshawar Zalmi. In game three, Lewis Gregory proved his worth to Islamabad United against the Multan Sultans. He scored 49 runs off 31 balls to give his team a 3 wicket win. The next day, Lahore were looking to continue their winning start against Quetta. They did this with half centuries from Mohammad Hafeez and Fakhar Zaman propelling them to a 9 wicket win. Tom Kohler-Cadmore helped himself to 53 to register Peshawar's first win of the season against Multan. James Vince earlier scored 84 to propel Multan to 194, but Cadmore and Imam-ul-Haq, who scored 48, gave Zalmi a 6 wicket win. In game six, Sharjeel Khan's 105 was not enough as Islamabad successfully chased down 197 to beat Karachi by 5 wickets. The next day, Multan got their first win of the season. Their captain Mohammad Rizwan led from the front scoring 76 to give Multan a 7 wicket win. On the same day, Peshawar chased down over 190 for the second time in a row to beat Quetta by 3 wickets.

Week 2

Babar Azam excelled in game nine, leading Karachi to a 7 wicket win over Multan. On the same day, Wahab Riaz took 4/17 to lead Peshawar to a 6 wicket win over Islamabad. In game 11, Lahore beat Karachi by 6 wickets despite Sharjeel Khan scoring 64. Islamabad United chased down 156 with 3 overs to spare in game twelve. This was largely down to Paul Stirling, who scored a half-century in the 6 wicket win. Babar Azam's 77 helped Karachi to a 6 wicket win over Peshawar in game 13. He was helped by Mohammad Nabi, who also scored a half-century to take them back to the top of the table. The last game before the tournament was suspended featured Quetta getting their first win of the season against Multan by 22 runs. This was the first time in the competition the team batting first won.

Week 3
The first game after the tournament resumed was between Islamabad and Lahore. James Faulkner took 3/32 on his debut to help Lahore to a 5 wicket win. Babar Azam's unbeaten 85 was in vain in game 16, as Multan beat Karachi by 12 runs. On the same day, Rashid Khan took 5 wickets in the match, as Lahore beat Peshawar by 10 runs. Islamabad's openers recorded the highest ever powerplay score in the PSL in game 18, they scored 97/0 as they helped United to a 10 wicket win over Quetta. David Miller kept Peshawar in contention for a playoff place in game 19. He scored 73 as Peshawar defeated Quetta by 61 runs. In game 20, Asif Ali counterattacked Lahore, giving Islamabad a 28 run win. Islamabad were 20-5 before Ali's innings of 75, which allowed them to post 152. Mohammad Rizwan led from the front in game 21, he scored an unbeaten 82 as Multan beat Peshawar by 8 wickets. In game 22, Colin Munro scored 88 to help Islamabad to an 8 wicket win over Karachi.

Week 4

Quetta Gladiators got a rare win in game 23, as Khurram Shazad took 3 wickets in an 18 run victory against Lahore. Hazratullah Zazai scored the joint fastest half-century in game 24, after Peshawar's bowlers restricted Karachi to 108 before Zalmi chased it down with 6 wickets to spare. Quetta were eliminated in game 25 at the hands of Multan. Quetta were bowled out for 73 which gave the Sultans a 110 run win. Records were broken in game 26, as an Usman Khawaja century propelled Islamabad to 247, the highest ever PSL score. In response, Peshawar scored 236 in the highest scoring PSL game ever. On the same day, in the second Karachi-Lahore derby of the season, the Kings beat the Qalandars by 7 runs to keep their playoff hopes alive. Lahore were in action the next day in game 28 losing by 80 runs to Multan, who, as a result, qualified for the playoffs; this was largely down to Shahnawaz Dahani, who took 4/5. Karachi needed a win in game 29 to qualify for the playoffs and knock out Lahore. They did this as a result of Danish Aziz's innings of 45 off 13, which enabled them to beat Quetta by 14 runs. Both teams were through in the last game of the group stage as Islamabad beat Multan by 4 wickets.

Playoffs

Qualifier

Multan won the toss in the Qualifier and chose to bat. Sohaib Maqsood top scored for the Sultans, making 59 from 41; Maqsood was well-supported by Johnson Charles, who made 41. Khushdil Shah also supported Maqsood with an unbeaten 42, as Multan finished on 180/5. The pick of the bowlers for Islamabad was Shadab Khan, who took 2/5 from 4 overs. In response for Islamabad, Usman Khawaja scored 70 off 40 as no other United batsman got past 30. Islamabad were all out for 149, giving Multan a 31 run win. For Multan, the pick of the bowlers was Sohail Tanvir, who took 3 wickets to send Multan into their first ever PSL final.

Eliminator

Eliminator 1

Peshawar won the toss in Eliminator 1 and chose to field. Karachi got off to a good start with Babar Azam making 53 before being dismissed. In the middle order Danish Aziz, Chadwick Walton and Imad Wasim came and went for Karachi, with none of them scoring more than 20. One player who did get going in the middle order was Thisara Perera; he scored 37 off 18 to take the Kings to 175/7 from their 20 overs. The pick of the bowlers for Peshawar was Mohammad Irfan, who took 2/21 from his 4 overs. In response for the Zalmi, Hazratullah Zazai, scored 77 off 38 to anchor Peshawar's chase.  While at 4 was Shoaib Malik, who scored 30 to further reduce the target for Peshawar. In the end, after a final over, which contained two dropped catches, Sherfane Rutherford's 17 helped to give Peshawar a 5 wicket win. For Karachi, the pick of the bowlers was Thisara Perera, who took 2/10 from his 2 overs. The result meant Peshawar were through to the second Eliminator, where they would face Islamabad United.

Eliminator 2

Peshawar won the toss and chose to field in Eliminator 2. Opening for United was Colin Munro, who made 44.  With Islamabad 110-8 it looked like they would be all out, however a cameo from Hasan Ali who scored 45 off 16 propelled them to 174. He was well supported by Mohammad Wasim who made an unbeaten 17. For much of Islamabad's innings, Peshawar were fielding with 10 fielders after Mohammad Irfan went off injured and was not allowed a replacement. The pick of the bowlers for the Zalmi was Wahab Riaz, who took 2/35. In Peshawar's response, Hazratullah Zazai, who scored 66 off 44, and Jonathan Wells, who scored 55 off 43, anchored Peshawar's innings bringing them closer to the target. Shoaib Malik applied the finishing touches for the Zalmi, scoring 32 off 10 as Peshawar wrapped up an 8 wicket win. For Islamabad the pick of the bowlers was Mohammad Wasim, who took 1/32 from his 3 overs. The result meant Peshawar were through to the final, their fourth overall.

Final

Peshawar won the toss and chose to bowl in the final. Shan Masood and Mohammad Rizwan opened the innings for the Sultans. Shan was dismissed first for 37 by Mohammad Imran. At the other end, Multan's captain, Mohammad Rizwan, was caught behind for 30 as Mohammad Imran claimed a second wicket. Afterwards, came Sohaib Maqsood, who made an unbeaten 65. This later won Maqsood the player of the match award. Rilee Rossouw followed Maqsood and made 50 in 20 balls, before he top edged a ramp to Mohammad Irfan as Sameen Gul claimed his first wicket of the match. The third wicket partnership between Maqsood and Rossouw was worth 98. Things got better for Sameen as he got out Johnson Charles Leg before wicket (LBW) for a golden duck. While at six was Khushdil Shah, who scored an unbeaten 15 off 5 balls to increase Multan's score. In the end, Multan finished on 206/4; the pick of the bowlers for Peshawar was Sameen Gul, who finished with figures of 2/26. In response, Hazratullah Zazai was first to score 6 for Peshawar before being caught at point by Shan Masood. Zazai was soon followed by Kamran Akmal, as he was bowled by Imran Khan for 36. Jonathan Wells was next, and he was run out for 6. Some stability was provided by Shoaib Malik and Rovman Powell, when Powell was caught behind for 23, Peshawar were 124/4. Malik was then caught out for 48 off 28 by Imran Tahir. Tahir then took a wicket himself as Sherfane Rutherford was dismissed for 18. Afterwards, Tahir claimed two more wickets as both Wahab Riaz and Mohammed Imran were bowled by him for golden ducks. Next to go was Amad Butt, as he was caught by Mohammad Rizwan for 7. In the end, Peshawar finished on 159/9, which resulted in a 47 run victory for Multan, making them the champions of PSL 6.

Awards and statistics
The player of the tournament was Sohaib Maqsood of Multan Sultans. His captain, Mohammad Rizwan,  won the Imtiaz Ahmed award for the best wicket-keeper, while Iftikhar Ahmed won the award for the best fielder. Shahnawaz Dahani of Multan took 20 wickets at an average of 17.00 to be the leading wicket-taker ahead of Wahab Riaz of Peshawar Zalmi with 18 wickets and win the Fazal Mahmood award. The winner of the Hanif Mohammad award for the leading run scorer was Babar Azam who scored 554 runs.

Most runs

Babar Azam of Karachi Kings received the Green Cap.

Most wickets

Shahnawaz Dahani of Multan Sultans received the Maroon Cap.

References

External links
 
 Series home at ESPNcricinfo

 
Pakistn Super League, 2021